State Road 132 (NM 132) is a state highway in the US state of New Mexico. NM 132's southern terminus is at NM 18/NM 218 in Hobbs, and the northern terminus is at Texas State Highway 83 (SH 83) and Farm to Market Road 769 (FM 769) at the Texas–New Mexico state line.

Major intersections

See also

References

External links

132
Transportation in Lea County, New Mexico